ARY Musik (formerly The Musik) is a Pakistani pay television music channel, first launched in 2003 as "The Musik" in Dubai by Salman Iqbal. It is part of the ARY Digital Network. In 2009 its name was changed to "ARY Musik". It features music genres including pop, rock, rap, bhangra, classical, and folk. It also airs interactive shows, celebrity interviews, comic fillers, theme shows, animations and live concerts.

The channel's longest-running international music based show was Music Hour with Wiqar Ali Khan, hosted in English and Pashto. ARY Musik is one of the first satellite channels to have live link-ups between its studios based in London, UK, USA, Pakistan, India, Bangladesh, Sri Lanka, Afghanistan and Dubai, Cologne and Slovenia.

Programs 
Programs aired by ARY Musik include:
 Bingo with Anoushey
 Cellaholic Live'
 Ghuru-Ho-Ja-Shuru Musik Top Ten Spot On Live Singing With Ovais Singstar Sajid Billa Salam-e-Ishaq Video on Trial Just Drive The Musik Records 
The Musik Records was a Pakistani record label that originated at the same time during the launch of ARY Musik and was active till the early 2010s. It retained ARY Musik's former name, The Musik. It was one of the two major record labels in Pakistan that was active till the 2010s with the other being Fire Records. Some of the albums the label released include Atif Aslam's Doorie, Haroon's Haroon Ka Nasha, Karavan's Saara Jahan'', Aaroh's Raag Neela and Mekaal Hasan Band's Saptak. The label had the distribution rights for these albums in Pakistan only.

Prior to ARY Musik's launch, the record label was referred to as ARY Records. Albums released under ARY Records include Faakhir's Aatish and Junoon's Daur-e-Junoon.

In 2016, the label under the network name ARY Musik released Abrar-Ul-Haq's album Billo Part 2.

See also 
 List of music channels in Pakistan

References

External links 
 

Television networks in Pakistan
ARY Digital
Music television channels
Television stations in Pakistan
Television channels and stations established in 2003
Music organisations based in Pakistan
Television stations in Karachi